North University of China (NUC) is a university based in Taiyuan, Shanxi province, China. It was formerly known as North China Institute of Technology from 1993 to 2004. Founded on September 8, 1941 as Taihang Industrial School, and renamed Taiyuan Institute of Machinery in 1958, the university played an important role in the weaponry development and personnel training for the PLA during the Second Sino-Japanese War and the Chinese Civil War. In 2001, senior Party official Bo Yibo wrote the inscription "The First School for People's Ordnance" (人民兵工第一校) at the 60th anniversary of the university.

History
NUC was formerly known as Taihang Industrial School, founded by the general headquarters of the Eighth Route Army in 1941. The first president was Liu Ding who was in charge of United Front at the time.

Early history
In 1949: The school was relocated to current address and renamed North China Vocational School of Ordnance (华北兵工职业学校). A few years later the name was changed to Taiyuan Machinery Manufacturing Industry School.
In 1958: The school was promoted to a college with the name changed to Taiyuan Institute of Machinery.

Amalgamation
In 1961: With approval from the State Council and Central Military Commission, the faculty, students, laboratory equipment, library materials of four departments related to conventional weapons (artillery, automatic weapons, ammunition, fuses) from Beijing Industrial College (北京工业学院) were merged into Taiyuan Institute of Machinery.
In 1962: Two departments related to conventional weapons (gunpowder, explosives) from Shenyang Institute of Technology (沈阳工学院) were merged into Taiyuan Institute of Machinery.
In 1963: Transferred under administration of the National Defense Science, Technology and Industry Committee and became one of the Eight Colleges of Defense Industry at that time.
In 1971: Transferred under administration of the 5th Department of Machinery Industry. The institute was temporarily shut down in July of the same year due to Cultural Revolution.
In 1993: Renamed North China Institute of Technology
In 2004: Renamed North University of China

The Eight Colleges of Defense Industry (ca. 1963)
Harbin Institute of Technology (哈尔滨工业大学)
Beijing Industrial College (北京工业学院). Renamed in 1988 as Beijing Institute of Technology (北京理工大学).
Beijing Aviation Institute (北京航空学院). Renamed in 1988 as Beijing University of Aeronautics and Astronautics (北京航空航天大学), and renamed (only in English) in 2002 as Beihang University.
Shanghai Jiao Tong University (上海交通大学)
Northwestern Polytechnical University (西北工业大学)
Chengdu Institute of Telecommunications Engineering (成都电讯工程学院). Renamed in 1988 as University of Electronic Science and Technology of China (电子科技大学).
Nanjing Industrial College (南京航空学院). Renamed in 1993 as Nanjing Aeronautics and Astronautics University (南京航空航天大学).
Taiyuan Institute of Machinery (太原机械学院). Renamed in 2004 to its present name, North University of China (中北大学).

Organization

List of presidents
Liu Ding (刘鼎)（May 1941 to Sep. 1943）
Liu Baoyin (牛宝印)（Feb. 1946 to July 1946）
Di Yaozong (邸耀宗)（August 1949 to Oct. 1952）
Li Ruikang (厉瑞康)（Oct. 1952 to March 1981）
He Yuanhai (何源海)（March 1981 to Dec. 1984）
Zu Jing (祖静)（Dec. 1984 to April 1995）
Yu Shiqian (俞士谦)（April 1995 to Oct. 2000）
Zhang Wendong (张文栋)（Oct. 2000 to Dec. 2009）
Jia Suotang (贾锁堂)（Jan. 2010 to August 2010）
Liu Youzhi (刘有智)（August 2012 to March 2018）
Shen Xingquan（沈兴全）(March 2018 up to now)

Schools and Departments 
1. School of Mechatronic Engineering
Department of Mechatronic Control Engineering
Department of Vehicle and Motive Force Engineering
Department of Power Mechanical Engineering

2. School of Mechanical Engineering and Automation
Department of Mechanical Engineering
Department of Industrial Engineering
Department of Process Control
Department of Mechanical Automation

3. School of Material Science and Engineering
Department of Material Science
Department of Material Manufacture Engineering

4. School of Chemical Engineering and Environment    
Department of Chemical Engineering
Department of Safety Engineering
Department of Environmental Engineering

5. School of Information and Communication Engineering 
Department of Electronic Engineering
Department of Information Engineering
Department of Communication Engineering
Department of Electric Engineering

6. School of Electronic and Computer Science and Technology       
Department of Electronic Science and Technology
Department of Computer Science and Technology
Department of Network Engineering

7. School of Science
Department of Mathematics
Department of Physics
Department of Chemistry
Department of Mechanics

8. School of Humanities and Social Sciences
Department of Law
Department of Foreign Languages
Department of Journalism and Communication
Department of Political and Administrative Science

9. School of Economics and Management
Department of Economics
Department of Management

10. School of Sports and Art
Department of Sports
Department of Art
Department of Music

13. Software School
Department of Software Engineering
Department of Network Engineering
Department of Information Technology

12. Graduate School

13. College of Continuing Education

Independent Colleges 
 College of Information and Business

Research 

North University of China was authorized by the State Council to confer M.S. degree in 1981 and Ph.D. in 1998. At present, the university has the right to confer M.S. degrees in 20 disciplines, and Ph.D.s in 4 disciplines. The university has 8 provincial and ministerial key disciplines, including Mechanical Manufacturing and Its Automation, Mechatronic Engineering, Test and Measurement Technology and Instrumentation, Materials Processing Engineering, Applied Chemistry, Special Mechanical System and Its Application Engineering, Energy Materials Engineering, and Precision Instrument and Mechanism. Over the years, with conditions for teaching and scientific research greatly improved, these disciplines have been playing the leading role, driving and promoting the development of other aspects.
Test and Measurement Technology and Instrumentations

In the evaluation by China University Alumni Association, 21st Century Talents, and University Weekly, NUC ranks 1st in this discipline in China universities 2006. There are national and provincial key laboratories in this discipline.

A research team composed of 10 doctorate supervisors, 18 professors, 19 associate professors or senior engineers engages itself in the discipline. Most members enjoy the Special Allowance by the State Council. Over the years great academic results, including 20 national and ministerial or provincial awards, have been achieved. At present over 40 national, ministerial and provincial research projects are under way.
Major research interests include: 
A. dynamic testing technology and intelligent instruments; 
B. Photoelectric Probing Theory and Technology; 
C. Special-type Sensing Theory and Technology; 
D. Modern Instrumentation and Testing Theory and Technology.

Precision Instrumentations and Machinery
Precision Instrumentations and Machinery is one of Shanxi provincial key disciplines.
A research team composed of 8 doctorate supervisors, 12 professors, 10 associate professors or senior engineers engages itself in the discipline. In recent years, 11 awards for scientific and technological achievements at national, ministerial or provincial level have been granted to the discipline.
Research institutes and laboratories in the discipline include: Micrometer and Nanometer Technology Research Center, Research Institute of Optoelectronic Information Technology, and Laboratory of Mechatronic Technology.
Major research interests include:
A. Design and Manufacturing Technology of Precision Instrumentations and Machinery; 
B. Optoelectronic Instruments and Equipment; 
C. Internal Structure Detecting Techniques for Industrial Purposes; 
D. Detecting and Control Technology; 
E. Inertia Space Sensing; 
F. Test and Control Technology; 
G. Advanced Micro-Nano Parts and System Technology; 
H. Photoelectric Technology; 
I. Non-destructive Test Technology.

Artillery, Automatic Gun and Ammunition Engineering
Artillery, Automatic Gun and Ammunition Engineering is one of Shanxi provincial key disciplines.
A research team composed of 15 doctorate supervisors, 2 members of China Academy of Engineering, 23 professors, and 23 associate professors, or senior engineers. In recent years, dozens of national, ministerial or provincial research projects have been accomplished and 53 projects are under way.
Major research interests include: 
A. Weapon Structures Design and Dynamic Research; 
B. Weapons Testing Technology; 
C. Warhead Structures and Control Technology; 
D. Warhead Terminal Effect and Anti-Penetrating Technology.

Weapon System and Application Engineering
Weapon System and Application Engineering is one of Shanxi provincial key disciplines.
A research team composed of 6 doctorate supervisors, 18 professors and 27 associate professors, many of them being noted experts in ordnance and aerospace organizations, engages itself in the discipline. In recent years, over 30 awards for scientific and technological achievements at national, ministerial or provincial level have been granted to the discipline.
Major research interests include: 
A. Weapon Safety Engineering; 
B. Design of Weapon Systems and Their Key Subsystems; 
C. Weapon System Confrontation Technology; 
D. Precision Guidance and Control of Conventional Warheads.
Applied Chemistry
Applied Chemistry is a key discipline at ministerial level.
A research team composed of 5 doctorate supervisors, 12 professors and 10 associate professors engages itself in the discipline.
Major research interests include: 
A. Special Energy Chemistry and Application; 
B. Synthetic Fine Chemical Products and Their Application; 
C. Functional Polymer Materials; 
D. Multiphase Fluid Mass in High-gravity Field; 
E. Ultra-fine Powder Materials and Their Chemical Reaction; 
F. Ultra-fine Powder Materials and Their Chemical Reaction.

Materials Processing Engineering
The discipline of Material Processing Engineering is an applied discipline which mainly deals with external shape and inner construction of materials as well as processing materials into needed parts and products.
A research team composed of 9 professors and 15 associate professors engages itself in the discipline. In recent years, 43 national, ministerial or provincial research projects have been accomplished and high-level awards have been granted to the discipline.
Major research interests include: 
A. Precise Control Plastic Forming Technology; 
B. Liquid Molding and Process Control Technology; 
C. Powder Materials, Laser Rapid Prototype Technology and Laser Agglomeration Rapid Prototype Technology; 
D. Design of Welding Materials and Testing Technology.
Many a research fruit, molding CAD, simulation of molding process, and simulation of the temperature field of solidifying mold, for example, has been commercialized.

Mechanical Manufacturing and Its Automation
Mechanical Manufacturing and Its Automation is a key discipline at ministerial level.
A research team composed of 15 professors, 8 associate professors engages itself in the discipline.
Major research interests include: 
A. CAD/CAM and Enterprise Informatization; 
B. Manufacture Automation Technology and System; 
C. Test, Measurement and Diagnosis of Mechanical Manufacture; 
D. CIMS; 
E. New Manufacture Technology and Equipment.

Signals and Information Processing
Signals and Information Processing focuses on the techniques of information processing, identifying and reconstructing, the theory and technology of information processing, technology of information processing and reconstructing, technology of information real-time processing and identifying, technology of information mixing, the photoelectric technology, technology of information safety and information confrontation, and image processing technology.
A research team composed of 1 member of China Academy of Engineering, 4 doctoral adviser, 16 professors engages itself in this discipline.
Major research interests include: 
A. Theory and Technology of Information Processing; 
B. Multi-dimension Information Processing; 
C. Testing and Processing of Biomedical Information;  
D. Information Testing and Automation and Information Countermeasures.

Key Laboratory 
 电子测试技术国防科技重点实验室（太原分部）
 Instrumentation Science and Dynamic Measurement Laboratory

Engineering Research Center 
 Engineering and Research Center for Booster Explosive Research, Development and Performance Testing
 Integrated Precision Plastic Forming Engineering and Technology Research Center
 Chemical Engineering Research Center
 Micro/Nano Technology Research Center
 Plastic Research Center
 无损检测中心

Results of Research
The black boxes of Shenzhou series manned spaceships are developed by NUC.

Publication 
 Journal of NUC (Natural Science)
 Journal of NUC (Social Science) 
 Journal of Test and Measurement Technology
 Journal of Measurement Science and Instrumentation (English)

See also
List of universities in China
National Key Disciplines
State Key Laboratories

References

External links
North University of China
Hanquan BBS

Universities and colleges in Shanxi